Priekule is a town in South Kurzeme Municipality in the Courland region of Latvia. As of 2020, the population was 1,872.

History
Priekule is first mentioned as a fortified manor in 1483 but only began to grow as a town after 1871 when the Liepāja–Vilnius Railway was built through Priekule. It was granted town rights in 1928 by the Latvian government.

See also
 List of cities in Latvia

References

Towns in Latvia
1928 establishments in Latvia
Populated places established in 1928
South Kurzeme Municipality
Grobin County
Courland